The prime minister of Yugoslavia was the head of government of the Yugoslav state, from the creation of the Kingdom of Serbs, Croats and Slovenes in 1918 until the breakup of the Socialist Federal Republic of Yugoslavia in 1992.

History

Kingdom of Yugoslavia

The Kingdom of Serbs, Croats and Slovenes was created by the unification of the Kingdom of Serbia (Montenegro had united with Serbia five days previously, while the regions of Kosovo and Metohija, Baranya, Syrmia, Banat, Bačka and Vardar Macedonia were parts of Serbia prior to the unification) and the provisional State of Slovenes, Croats and Serbs (itself formed from territories of the former Austria-Hungary) on 1 December 1918.

Until 6 January 1929, the Kingdom of Serbs, Croats and Slovenes was a parliamentary monarchy. On that day, King Alexander I abolished the Vidovdan Constitution (adopted in 1921), prorogued the National Assembly and introduced a personal dictatorship (so-called 6 January Dictatorship). He renamed the country Kingdom of Yugoslavia on 3 October 1929, and although introduced the 1931 Constitution, he continued to rule as a de facto absolute monarch until his assassination on 9 October 1934, during a state visit to France. After his assassination, parliamentary monarchy was put back in place.

The Kingdom of Yugoslavia was defeated and occupied on 17 April 1941 after the German invasion. The monarchy was formally abolished and the republic proclaimed on 29 November 1945.

SFR Yugoslavia

After the German invasion and fragmentation of the Kingdom of Yugoslavia, the Partisan resistance in occupied Yugoslavia formed a deliberative council, the Anti-Fascist Council of National Liberation of Yugoslavia (AVNOJ) in 1942. On 29 November 1943 the AVNOJ proclaimed the Democratic Federal Yugoslavia, and appointed the National Committee for the Liberation of Yugoslavia (NKOJ), led by Prime Minister Josip Broz Tito, as its government. Josip Broz Tito was quickly recognized by the Allies at the Tehran Conference, and the royalist government-in-exile in London was pressured into agreeing on a merge with the NKOJ. In order to facilitate this, Ivan Šubašić was appointed by the King to head the London government.

For a period, Yugoslavia had two recognized prime ministers and governments (which both agreed to formally merge as soon as possible): Josip Broz Tito leading the NKOJ in occupied Yugoslavia, and Ivan Šubašić leading the King's government-in-exile in London. With the Tito-Šubašić Agreement in 1944, the two prime ministers agreed that the new joint government would be led by Tito. After the liberation of Yugoslavia's capital Belgrade in October 1944, the joint government was officially formed on 2 November 1944, with Josip Broz Tito as the prime minister.

After the war, elections were held ending in an overwhelming victory for Tito's People's Front. The new parliament deposed King Peter II on 29 November 1945, and declared a Federal People's Republic of Yugoslavia (in 1963, the state was renamed Socialist Federal Republic of Yugoslavia). The government was first headed by a prime minister up to 14 January 1953, when major decentralization reforms reorganized the government into the Federal Executive Council chaired by a President, who was still usually called "Prime Minister" in non-Yugoslav sources. Josip Broz Tito held the post from 1944 to 1963; from 1953 onward, he was also President of the Republic.

Five out of nine heads of government of Yugoslavia in this period were of Croatian ethnicity. Three were from Croatia itself (Josip Broz Tito, Mika Špiljak, and Milka Planinc), while two were Bosnian Croats (Branko Mikulić and Ante Marković). Ante Marković however, though a Croat from Bosnia and Herzegovina by birth, was a politician of Croatia like Špiljak and Planinc, serving (at different times) as both prime minister and president of the presidency of that federal unit.

List

Timeline

See also
 Deputy Prime Minister of Yugoslavia
 List of heads of state of Yugoslavia
 Chairman of the Council of Ministers of Bosnia and Herzegovina
 Prime Minister of Croatia
 Prime Minister of Serbia and Montenegro
 Prime Minister of Montenegro
 Prime Minister of North Macedonia
 Prime Minister of Serbia
 Prime Minister of Slovenia

References

Government of Yugoslavia
Yugoslavia
 
Prime ministers
1918 establishments in Yugoslavia
1992 disestablishments in Yugoslavia